Haley Maria Stevens (born June 24, 1983) is an American politician serving as the U.S. representative from  since 2019. A member of the Democratic Party, Stevens was elected to represent the 11th district in the 2022 election, defeating 9th district incumbent Andy Levin in the primary and Republican nominee Mark Ambrose in the general election. Her district includes many of Detroit's northern and western suburbs, including Rochester Hills, Auburn Hills, Troy, Royal Oak, Bloomfield Hills, Birmingham, West Bloomfield, Farmington, Farmington Hills, and Pontiac.

Early life and career
Stevens grew up in Rochester Hills, Michigan, and graduated from Seaholm High School in Birmingham. She attended American University, and graduated with a Bachelor of Arts in political science and philosophy, and a Master of Arts in social policy and philosophy. She became involved in politics in 2006, working for the Michigan Democratic Party as a volunteer organizer. She worked on Hillary Clinton's and Barack Obama's presidential campaigns in 2008, beginning with Clinton before the primary.

In 2009, Steven Rattner hired Stevens to join the Presidential Task Force on the Auto Industry, and she served as his chief of staff. She worked for the Digital Manufacturing and Design Innovation Institute in Chicago, returning to Michigan in 2017.

U.S. House of Representatives

Elections

2018 

Over January and February 2017, Stevens moved back to Rochester Hills. The district had been represented by two-term Republican Dave Trott.

Trott announced his retirement in September 2017, making the 11th an open seat. Stevens defeated state Representative Tim Greimel in the Democratic Party primary election and Republican businesswoman Lena Epstein in the general election. Her victory, and that of Elissa Slotkin in the neighboring 8th district, made it the first time since the 1930s that no Republicans represented Oakland County in the House. She also became the first Democrat to represent the 11th for a full term since it assumed its current configuration in 2003.

Stevens and Colin Allred, both alumni of the Obama administration, were selected as co-presidents of the House Democratic Freshman Class of the 116th United States Congress.

2020 

Stevens ran for reelection. She was unopposed in the Democratic primary.  In the general election, she defeated the Republican nominee, Eric Esshaki, by less than expected.

2022 

Stevens defeated Andy Levin, 60%-40%, becoming the first woman to represent the 11th District.   As a result of population loss, Michigan lost a seat in the United States House of Representatives.  The newly drawn 11th District put Stevens and fellow Congressman Andy Levin in the same district.  The redrawing of the district covered more of Stevens's earlier electoral base.  She reportedly outspent Levin by a factor of five. Her victory was aided by $5 million from EMILY's list and by the American Israel Public Affairs Committee, which invested $4 million targeting Levin and hailed her victory as proof that "being pro-Israel is both good policy and good politics". Changes in generational and gender dynamics are also said to have played an important role, with a long term Oakland Democrat trend to favor women, and the impact of the Supreme Court's overturning the Roe v. Wade and Planned Parenthood v. Casey precedents regarding abortion.

Tenure 
As of November 2021, Stevens had voted in line with Joe Biden's stated position 100% of the time.

Committee assignments 
 Committee on Education and Labor
 Subcommittee on Health, Employment, Labor, and Pensions
 Subcommittee on Workforce Protections
 Committee on Science, Space, and Technology (Vice-Chair)
 United States House Science Subcommittee on Energy
 Subcommittee on Research and Technology (Chair)

Caucus memberships 
New Democrat Coalition
Problem Solvers Caucus

Electoral history

Personal life
Stevens lives in Waterford. She and Rob Gulley, a software engineer she met in high school, became engaged in June 2020. They married on September 3, 2021. On October 5, 2022, Stevens and Gulley announced their divorce.

See also
2022 United States House of Representatives elections in Michigan
Women in the United States House of Representatives

References

External links

 Congresswoman Haley Stevens official U.S. House website
 Haley Stevens for Congress campaign website

|-

1983 births
Living people
American University alumni
Democratic Party members of the United States House of Representatives from Michigan
Female members of the United States House of Representatives
People from Rochester Hills, Michigan
Political chiefs of staff
21st-century American women politicians